The Arabic nisbah (attributive title) Al-Dimashqi denotes an origin from Damascus, Syria.

Al-Dimashqi may refer to:

 Al-Dimashqi (geographer): a medieval Arab geographer.
 Abu al-Fadl Ja'far ibn 'Ali al-Dimashqi: 12th-century Muslim merchant.
 Al-Dhahabi: Shafi'i Muhaddith and historian of Islam.
 Ibn al-Nafis: Arab physician who is mostly famous for being the first to describe the pulmonary circulation of the blood.
 Ibn Qayyim Al-Jawziyya: a prominent Sunni Islamic jurist.
 Ibn 'Asakir: a Sunni Islamic scholar and historian
 John of Damascus (Yuhanna al-Dimashqi) - Christian monk

See also
 List of people from Damascus

Arabic-language surnames
Dimashqi